Mathias Rissi was a New Testament scholar and teacher, the Walter H. Robertson Professor of New Testament   at Union Theological Seminary, Richmond He is a specialist in  the Book of Revelations and the Gospel of John.

He was born in Wienacht, Appenzell, Switzerland   on September 29, 1920, and grew up in his native land. His university studies were at Zurich and at Basel under professors Karl Barth, Oscar Cullman, Eduard Thurneysen , and Emil Brunner.  Under Karl Barth he received his doctorate in 1951.
He also had substantial experience as a teacher; for nine years he had been a lecturer at the Theological Faculty of the University of Basel under his mentor Karl Barth. 
In 1966, three years after joining the faculty in Richmond, Va,, Rissi was elected Walter H. Robertson Professor of New Testament 

Though his responsibilities have ranged more widely, his teaching, research and writing have focused especially on the Johannine literature.  In the 1970’s  and 80’s Rissi and his wife Veronica Rissi Truedinger both taught ecumenical summer courses at the University of Vienna, Austria. Her area of expertise included the art und history of the region.    Rissi retired after 24 years on the faculty in 1987 and moved with his wife to Stonington, Maine where he continued to publish books and articles. He died at Charlotte, NC. 1 March 2006

References

External links
1. Mathias Rissi; https://web.archive.org/web/20101010161022/http://catalog.hathitrust.org/ (published works)

2. The Qumran Scrolls and John's Gospel; http://www.forskningsdatabasen.dk/en/catalog/2389278837

3. https://doi.org/10.1177%2F002096439204600117 (book reviews)

4. https://www.librarything.com/author/rissimathias

5. https://biblio.com.au/mathias-rissi/author/576846

Bibliography
Bibliography: (link: http://worldcat.org/identities/lccn-n85264071/ )

1952	Zeit und Geschichte in der Offenbarung des Johannes (Zwingli Verlag, 1952);  6 editions published in 1952 in German and held by 116 WorldCat libraries 
translated as   Time and history: a study on the Revelation (John Knox Press, 1966); 19 editions published between 1965 and 1966 in German and English and held by 434 WorldCat libraries
1952 Die Zeit- und Geschichtsauffassung der Johannesapokalypse (Zwingli Verlag, 1952);7 editions published between 1950 and 1952 in German and held by 13 WorldCat libraries 
1962 Die Taufe für die Toten : ein Beitrag zur paulinischen Tauflehre (Zwingli Verlag, 1962); 12 editions published between 1962 and 1969 in German and held by 165 WorldCat libraries 1 
1965 Was ist und was geschehen soll danach: Die Zeit-und Geschichtsauffassung der Offenbarung des Johannes (Zwingli Verlag, 1965)
1966 Alpha und Omega; eine Deutung der Johannesoffenbarung (Friedrich Reinhardt Verlag, Berlin, 1966);6 editions published in 1966 in German and held by 70 WorldCat libraries 
1969 Studien zum zweiten Korintherbrief : Der alte Bund, Der Prediger, Der Tod (Zwingli Verlag, 1969);12 editions published in 1969 in German and held by 184 WorldCat libraries 
1972 The future of the world : an exegetical study of Revelation (Study in Biblical Theology, 2/22/72, pages 19.11–22.15, SCM Press, London, 1972); 29 editions published between 1966 and 1972 in English and German and held by 559 WorldCat libraries 
1987 Die Theologie des Hebräerbriefs : ihre Verankerung in der Situation des Verfassers und seiner Leser (Mohr Siebeck Verlag, 1987); 9 editions published in 1987 in German and held by 190 WorldCat member libraries worldwide 
1995 Die Hure Babylon und die Verführung der Heiligen : eine Studie zur Apokalypse des Johannes (Kohlhammer Verlag, 1995); 8 editions published between 1995 and 2011 in German and held by 151 WorldCat member libraries worldwide

1920 births
2006 deaths
People from Appenzell Innerrhoden
Swiss emigrants to the United States
University of Zurich alumni
Swiss theologians
Union Presbyterian Seminary faculty
University of Basel alumni
New Testament scholars